is a college of technology (kosen)in Tsuyama, Okayama, Japan. The college was founded in 1963.

Institution
Tsuyama National College of Technology (Tsuyama Technical College), founded in 1963. The school has sent about 6,300 graduates into the world, who fulfill important positions in industry and society.  The five year system at the college consists of four departments: Mechanical Engineering, Electrical and Electronic Engineering, Electronics and Control Engineering, and Computer and information Engineering. Each department accepts 40 students per year, and provides technical training at an early age, emphasizing quality and professionalism.
The engineering program at this college has been evaluated and accredited by the Japan Accreditation Board for Engineering Education (JABEE). The college’s engineering program thus meets global standards for engineering education. Furthermore, in 2007, this college was accredited by the National Institution for Academic Degrees and University Evaluation.

Organization

Main Course 
 Department of Mechanical Engineering
 Department of Electrical and Electronic Engineering
 Department of Electronics and Control Engineering
 Department of Computer and Information Engineering

Advanced Course ( Bachelor Program)
 Advanced Mechanical and Control System Engineering
 Advanced Electronics and Information System Engineering

External links
 Official website 

Educational institutions established in 1963
Universities and colleges in Okayama Prefecture
1963 establishments in Japan
Tsuyama